Kevin Owens (born ) is an American former professional basketball player, author and podcaster.

In 2009 Owens played with Sigal Prishtina of the Kosovo Super League.  Prior to that Owens played for the Wellington Saints in Wellington, New Zealand and the Ulsan Mobis Phoebus in Ulsan, South Korea of the Korean Basketball League. In the 2006–2007 season Owens played for the Cairns Taipans in Cairns, Australia. Before playing in Australia, Owens played three seasons with the Roanoke Dazzle in the NBA Development League, a minor league system for the National Basketball Association.

Born in Haddonfield, New Jersey, Owens attended Camden Catholic High School in Cherry Hill, New Jersey. He played Division I college basketball at Monmouth University.

At the tail end of his career and immediately after, Owens was a basketball writer/contributor for a number of publications including SLAM Online and SB Nation.

In August 2021, Owens published a collection of stories about his overseas basketball experiences titled Overseas Famous, forwarded by former NBA star and Owens' former coach Chucky Brown, with advanced praise by Lang Whitaker.

References

External links
Eurobasket bio
Basketball-reference.com stats

1980 births
Living people
American expatriate basketball people in Australia
American expatriate basketball people in Estonia
American expatriate basketball people in New Zealand
American expatriate basketball people in South Korea
American men's basketball players
Basketball players from New Jersey
BC Kalev/Cramo players
Cairns Taipans players
Camden Catholic High School alumni
Centers (basketball)
Goyang Carrot Jumpers players
Korean Basketball League players
Monmouth Hawks men's basketball players
People from Haddonfield, New Jersey
Roanoke Dazzle players
Sportspeople from Camden County, New Jersey